The women's canoe sprint K-2 500 metres competition at the 2012 Olympic Games in London took place between 7 and 9 August at Eton Dorney.

Franziska Weber and Tina Dietze, representing Germany, won the gold medal. Hungary's Katalin Kovács and Natasa Dusev-Janics took silver and the bronze medal was won by Karolina Naja and Beata Mikołajczyk from Poland.

Competition format
The competition comprised heats, semi-finals, and a final round. The top five boats from each heat, and the fastest loser, advanced to the semi-finals. The top four boats in each semi-final advanced to the "A" final, and competed for medals. A placing "B" final was held for the other semi-finalists.

Schedule

All times are British Summer Time (UTC+01:00)

Results

Heats
The five fastest boats and the best-timed loser qualified to the semi-finals.

Heat 1

Heat 2

Heat 3

Semifinals
The fastest four canoeists in each semi-final qualified for the 'A' final. The slowest four qualified for the placing 'B' final.

Semifinal 1

Semifinal 2

Finals

Final B

Final A

References

Canoeing at the 2012 Summer Olympics
Olyp
Women's events at the 2012 Summer Olympics